Super Simple Songs  (previously called Super Simple Learning) is a YouTube channel and streaming media show created by Devon Thagard and Troy McDonald, and owned by Skyship Entertainment since 2015. It's based on animation videos of both traditional nursery rhymes and their own original children's songs. As of April 30, 2021, it is the 105th most-subscribed YouTube channel in the world and the second most-subscribed YouTube channel in Canada, with 28.6 million subscribers, and the 23rd most-viewed YouTube channel in the world and the most-viewed YouTube channel in Canada, with 27.9 billion views.

Content 
Super Simple Songs' videos include children, adults, animals, puppets and creatures who interact with each other in daily life and sing songs. It is available on Spotify, Amazon Music, Apple Music, Amazon Prime Video and Deezer. Their YouTube content consists of standalone music videos and compilations similar to the Sesame Street universe.

History 
Super Simple Songs was started in 2005 by teachers of a small English school in Tokyo, Japan. They created their own songs in place of children's songs that were too complex and difficult to be used in teaching. After increasing in popularity from other teachers, they released their first CD. In 2006, Super Simple Songs began uploading videos to YouTube. They originally uploaded videos of teaching tips for teachers on how to use their songs in the classroom. They started uploading videos just for kids after realizing that kids were also watching the teaching tips. 

On 27 February 2012, they reached 100 thousand subscribers. On 27 April 2014, they reached 1 million subscribers. On 29 May 2018, they reached 10 million subscribers.

References 

Children's mass media
Education-related YouTube channels
YouTube channels launched in 2006